Fès-Meknès or Fez-Meknes is among the twelve Regions of Morocco. It has a population of 4,236,892 (2014 census). Its capital is Fez. Its current president is Mohand Laenser, and its current wali is Said Zniber.

History
Fès-Meknes was formed in September 2015 by merging Fès-Boulemane with the prefecture of Meknès and the provinces of El Hajeb and Ifrane (in Meknès-Tafilalet region) and the provinces of Taounate and Taza (in Taza-Al Hoceima-Taounate region).

Administrative divisions

The region of Fès-Meknes contains 7 provinces and 2 prefectures:

References